ChimerDB in computational biology is a database of fusion sequences.

ChimerDB currently consists of three searchable datasets.

ChimerKB is a curated knowledge base of 1,066 fusion genes sourced from publicly available scientific literature.
ChimerPub provides continuously updated descriptions on fusion genes text mined from publications.
ChimerSeq is a database of RNA-seq data of fusion sequences downloaded from the TCGA data portal.

See also
 ECgene
 Fusion gene

References

External links
 http://203.255.191.229:8080/chimerdbv31/mindex.cdb 

Biological databases
Genes
Gene expression